The non-canonical books referenced in the Bible includes non-Biblical cultures, and lost works of known or unknown status. By the "Bible" is meant those books recognised by most Christians and Jews as being part of Old Testament (or Tanakh) as well as those recognised by Christians alone as being part of the Biblical apocrypha or of the Deuterocanon. 

It may also include books of the Anagignoskomena that are accepted only by Eastern Orthodox Christians. For the purposes of this article, "referenced" can mean direct quotations, paraphrases, or allusions, which in some cases are known only because they have been identified as such by ancient writers, or the citation of a work or author.

Hebrew Bible 

The following are mentioned in the Hebrew Bible:
From the context in the Book of Samuel, it is implied that it was a collection of poetry. Several books have claimed to be this lost text, some of which are discounted as pseudepigrapha. Certain members of the Church of Jesus Christ of Latter-day Saints secured the copyright to a particular English translation of one of these and republished it in 1887 in Salt Lake City.
It is speculatively associated with one of the Dead Sea Scrolls, the War of the Sons of Light Against the Sons of Darkness. The Book of the Wars of the Lord is also cited in the Book of Jasher (trans. Moses Samuel c. 1840, ed. J. H. Parry 1887) Chapter 90:48 as being a collaborative record written by Moses, Joshua and the children of Israel.
 The Chronicles of the Kings of Israel and Chronicles of the Kings of Judah are mentioned in the Books of Kings. They are said to tell of events during the reigns of Kings Jeroboam of Israel and Rehoboam of Judah, respectively. The Chronicles of the Kings of Israel is again mentioned in  regarding King Zimri, and many other times throughout 1 and 2 Kings.
 The Book of Shemaiah the Prophet and Story of the Prophet Iddo (also called Visions of Iddo the Seer or The Annals of the Prophet Iddo) are mentioned in the 2nd Book of Chronicles.. This book has been completely lost to history, save for its title.
 The Manner of the Kingdom.
 The Acts of Solomon.
 The Annals of King David.
 The Book of Samuel the Seer. Also called Samuel the Seer or The Acts of Samuel the Seer, which could be the same as 1 & 2 Samuel.
 The Book of Nathan the Prophet. Also called Nathan the Prophet or The Acts of Nathan the Prophet or History of Nathan the Prophet.
 The Book of Gad the Seer.
 The Prophecy of Ahijah, might be a reference to 1 Kings 14:2–18.
 The Book of the Kings of Judah and Israel. Might be the same as 1 & 2 Kings.
 The Book of Jehu, could be a reference to 1 Kings 16:1–7.
 The Story of the Book of Kings.
 The Acts of Uziah. Also called The Book by the prophet Isaiah. Perhaps the same as the Book of Isaiah.
 The Vision of Isaiah.
 The Acts of the Kings of Israel. Also called The Acts and Prayers of Manasseh. May be identical to The Book of the Kings of Israel, above.
 The Sayings of the Seers.
 The Laments for Josiah. Also called Lamentations. This event is recorded in the existing Book of Lamentations.
 The Chronicles of King Ahasuerus.

Deuterocanon / Apocrypha 

 Aesop's fable of The Two Pots referenced at 
 The Egyptian Satire of the Trades, or another work in that tradition referenced at 
 "The archives" referenced by 
 "letters of the kings" referenced by 
 "five books by Jason of Cyrene" referenced by : the author of 2 Maccabees here tells us that the work is abridged from the history by Jason.
 "the king's letter" referenced by

New Testament 
Mennonite scholar David Ewart has mentioned that Nestle's Greek New Testament lists some 132 New Testament passages that appear to be verbal allusions to paracanonical books.

Pagan authors quoted or alluded to:
Menander, Thais 218
Epimenides, de Oraculis, (where Paul introduces Epimenides as "a prophet of the Cretans," see Epimenides paradox)
Aratus, Phaenomena 5, (where Paul refers to the words of "some of your own poets")
Non-canonical books quoted or alluded to:
Book of Enoch (and  ).
Apocryphon of Jannes and Jambres, according to Origen ( "... as Jannes and Jambres withstood Moses")
Epistle to the Laodiceans ( "read the epistle from Laodicea")
Life of Adam and Eve ( "Satan as an angel of light",  "Third Heaven")
A lost section of the Assumption of Moses (Jude 9 "Michael.. body of Moses")
Ascension of Isaiah ( "they were sawn in two")
Paul's letter to the Corinthians before 1 Corinthians ( "I wrote to you in my letter...")
Paul’s letter to the Ephesians before Ephesians ( “As I wrote afore in few words...”)
An unknown messianic prophecy possibly from a non-canonical source, quoted in Matthew 2:23 that states "...he will be called a Nazorian." ("ὅτι Ναζωραῖος κληθήσεται"). This is speculated to be a vague allusion to a quote about Samson in Judges 13:5 that uses a similar-sounding word: "the child shall be a Nazirite" (ναζιρ)
It has been speculated that Paul is simply paraphrasing , but there is no clear indication that this is not a complete quote.
This may also be an allusion to the similar , "For from days of old they have not heard or perceived by ear, nor has the eye seen a God besides You, Who acts in behalf of the one who waits for Him.'".

See also 
 Agrapha
 Biblical apocrypha
 Biblical canon
 Jewish apocrypha
 List of Gospels
 List of names for the biblical nameless
 New Testament apocrypha

Notes 

Bible content
Lists of books about religion
Old Testament apocrypha
New Testament apocrypha
Ancient Hebrew texts